United States Coast Guard Buoy Depot, South Weymouth is a United States Coast Guard facility located in Weymouth, Massachusetts. It is located to the southeast of the South Weymouth MBTA station and west of the former Naval Air Station South Weymouth.

See also
List of military installations in Massachusetts

References

External links
Information about the depot

United States Coast Guard
Military installations in Massachusetts